The Boss Harmony Sessions is an album by the New York City ska band The Slackers. It was released on Special Potato in 2007 (See 2007 in Music).

Track listing
 "Boss Harmony Speaks" (Boss Harmony) - 0:33
 "Robots" (Ruggiero) - 4:41
 "Feed My Girl (ska Version)" (Geard/Lyn) - 4:01
 "Funk Week" (Pine) - 3:57
 "Mama Told Me" (R. Newman; arr. The Slackers) - 4:59
 "Mind Your Own Business" (Traditional; arr. The Slackers) - 3:37
 "El Gato" (Ruggiero/Hillyard) - 2:36
 "Ska Boheme" (Traditional; arr. The Slackers) - 4:09
 "Wanted Man" (Dylan; arr. The Slackers) - 3:04
 "Yer Still Blue" (Ruggiero) - 3:14
 "Minha Menina" (J. Ben; arr. The Slackers) - 4:10
 "Lil' Joe" (Hillyard/Desert) - 3:19
 "Body Double" (Pine) - 4:19
 "Boss Harmony Says Goodbye" (Boss Harmony) - 0:30

Personnel

Players
 Ara Babajian - drums
 Marcus Geard - bass
 Dave Hillyard - saxophone
 Jay Nugent - guitar
 Glen Pine - trombone, vocals
 Vic Ruggiero - organ, piano, vocals

2006 albums
The Slackers albums